Leucania venalba is a moth of the family Noctuidae first described by Frederic Moore in 1867. It is found in Indo-Australian tropics of India, Sri Lanka, to Fiji and New Caledonia.

Forewings brown without a distinct pale spot at the discal end found on other related species. Half a dark-edged white line runs down the middle of each forewing. Hindwings off white with some darkening basally. The caterpillar is a semi looper. Early instars are grey, which become greener with each developing instar while eating. Head golden brown. A broad, double, purple-brown dorsal line is visible. Late instars brownish with minute dark markings. Underparts pale olive brown. Larval food plants are several grasses and Oryza species.

References

External links
Occurrence law of armyworm in China and its identification and prevention
Study on the spatial distribution pattern and sampling technique for larvea of mixed populations of Leucania separata, Leucania venalba and Leucania lorcyi in rice field
Insecticidal Control of Agrotis infusa (Boisd.) and Leucania unipuncta (Haw.) in Field Crops
Molecular Phylogeny of Indonesian Armyworm Mythimna Guenée (Lepidoptera: Noctuidae: Hadeninae) Based on CO I Gene Sequences

Moths of Asia
Moths described in 1867
Hadeninae